Peter Bramley may refer to:

 Peter Bramley (director), English actor and theatre director
 Peter Bramley (biochemist) (born 1948), British biochemist
 Peter Bramley (cricketer) (1785–1838), English cricketer